German submarine U-383 was a Type VIIC U-boat of Nazi Germany's Kriegsmarine during World War II.

The submarine was laid down on 29 March 1941 at the Howaldtswerke yard at Kiel, launched on 22 April 1942, and commissioned on 6 June under the command of Oberleutnant zur See Horst Kremser.

Design
German Type VIIC submarines were preceded by the shorter Type VIIB submarines. U-383 had a displacement of  when at the surface and  while submerged. She had two shafts and two  propellers.

U-383 was fitted with five  torpedo tubes (four fitted at the bow and one at the stern), fourteen torpedoes, one  SK C/35 naval gun, 220 rounds, and a  C/30 anti-aircraft gun. The boat had a complement of between forty-four and sixty.

Service history
U-383 served with the 8th U-boat Flotilla for training, and then operationally with the 9th flotilla from 1 October 1942 to 1 August 1943. She completed four patrols in that time, sinking only one ship, the  Icelandic trawler Jon Olafsson on 24 October 1942, during her first patrol.

On the evening of 1 August 1943 U-383 was attacked west of Brittany, at position , by a Short Sunderland of No. 228 Squadron RAF. Responding with flak, the U-boat holed the fuselage and shot away the starboard float and aileron of the aircraft, which pressed home its attack and straddled the U-boat with depth charges before heading back to base. Kremser radioed for assistance, and though three U-boats and three torpedo boats searched during the night and the next day, they failed to locate the crippled U-383 and she was presumed lost.

Wolfpacks
U-383 took part in ten wolfpacks, namely:
 Puma (26 – 29 October 1942) 
 Natter (30 October – 8 November 1942) 
 Kreuzotter (8 – 18 November 1942) 
 Habicht (10 – 19 January 1943) 
 Haudegen (19 January – 15 February 1943) 
 Sturmbock (23 – 26 February 1943) 
 Amsel (22 April – 3 May 1943) 
 Amsel 2 (3 – 6 May 1943) 
 Elbe (7 – 10 May 1943) 
 Elbe 2 (10 – 14 May 1943)

Summary of raiding history

References

Bibliography

External links

German Type VIIC submarines
U-boats commissioned in 1942
U-boats sunk in 1943
U-boats sunk by depth charges
U-boats sunk by British aircraft
World War II submarines of Germany
World War II shipwrecks in the Atlantic Ocean
1942 ships
Ships built in Kiel
Ships lost with all hands
Maritime incidents in August 1943